Boselaphus is a genus of bovid. The nilgai is the sole living representative, although one other species is known from the fossil record.

The nilgai along with the four-horned antelope are the only living members of the tribe Boselaphini.

References

Mammal genera
Mammal genera with one living species
Taxa named by Henri Marie Ducrotay de Blainville
Bovines